Anatolian blues or Turkish blues music is a type of music that is a combination of Turkish folk music and blues. Yavuz Çetin, Asım Can Gündüz and Can Gox are the most known singers and musicians in Anatolian blues music.

History 
After the 1970s, blues and jazz music became more common and have been started to use with the traditional folk music, Türküs, this has led to the Anatolian Blues genre to born in Turkey.

Musicians and musical groups 
 Yavuz Çetin
Can Gox
Murat Ertel
Asım Can Gündüz
Evrencan Gündüz

Groups
 Blue Blues Band
 Gevende
 Eis Ten Polin
 Bangkok B.B.
 Better Blues Band
 Bluesaint Blues Band
 Blues-Mobil
 Bluestaff
 Fötr Blues Band
 Kingus Blues Band
 Lackawanna Soul & Blues Band
 Tarık Değirmenci Blues Band
 Sahte Rakı Blues Band
 Yiğitcan Sağır Trio

See also 

 Turkish folk music
 Anatolian rock

References 

Anatolian blues
20th-century music genres
Turkish music
Blues music genres
Fusion music genres